Susan Ellen Alcock is an American archaeologist specializing in survey archaeology and the archaeology of memory in the provinces of the Roman Empire. Alcock grew up in Massachusetts and was educated at Yale and the University of Cambridge. She is currently Special Counsel for Institutional Outreach and Engagement and Professor of Classical Archaeology and Classics at the University of Michigan and became the Interim Provost and Vice Chancellor for Academic Affairs at the University of Michigan - Flint in July 2018.

Early life and education
From 1979 to 1983, Alcock studied at Yale University, graduating summa cum laude with a Bachelor of Arts degree in Archaeology and History. She then studied classics at the University of Cambridge, graduating with a first class BA in 1985; as per tradition, this BA was promoted to a Master of Arts (MA Cantab) degree in 1989. She remained at Cambridge to undertake postgraduate research, and completed her PhD in 1989 with a doctoral thesis titled "Greek society and the transition to Roman rule".

Career
Alcock served as the Director of the Joukowsky Institute for Archaeology and the Ancient World and Professor of Classics at Brown University from January 2006 until 2015. Prior to that, she was the John H. D'Arms Professor of Classical Archaeology at the University of Michigan. She was co-director of the Pylos Regional Archaeological Project in southwestern Greece, then co-director of the Vorotan Project in southern Armenia, and is now director of the Brown University Petra Archaeological Project. In 2000 she was awarded a MacArthur Fellowship.

In 2018 Alcock was appointed as the interim provost and vice chancellor for academic affairs at the University of Michigan-Flint.

Publications

 Graecia Capta: The Landscapes of Roman Greece (Cambridge 1993)
 (editor with Robin Osborne) Placing the Gods: Sanctuaries and Sacred Space in Ancient Greece (Oxford 1994)
 (editor) The Early Roman Empire in the East (Oxford 1997)
 Archaeologies of the Greek Past: Landscape, Monuments and Memory (Cambridge 2001)
 (edited with John Cherry and Jas Elsner) Pausanias: Travel and Memory in Roman Greece (New York 2001)
 (editor with Terence D'Altroy, Kathleen Morrison and Carla Sinopoli) Empires: Perspectives from History and Archaeology (Cambridge 2001)
 (editor with Ruth Van Dyke) The Archaeology of Memory (Oxford 2003)
 (editor with John Cherry) Side-by-Side Survey: Comparative Regional Analysis in the Mediterranean Region (Oxford 2004)
 (editor with Lauren Talalay) In the Field: The Archaeological Expeditions of the Kelsey Museum of Archaeology (Ann Arbor 2006)

References

External links
 Faculty page at Brown
 Brown University Petra Archaeological Project (BUPAP)
 University of Michigan, Special Counsel for Institutional Outreach and Engagement, Office of the President

Living people
MacArthur Fellows
American archaeologists
Brown University faculty
American women archaeologists
University of Michigan faculty
Yale College alumni
Alumni of the University of Cambridge
American expatriates in England
Year of birth missing (living people)
American women academics
Corresponding Fellows of the British Academy
21st-century American women